Bagerhat-2 is a constituency represented in the Jatiya Sangsad (National Parliament) of Bangladesh since 2019 by Sheikh Tanmoy of the Awami League.

Boundaries 
The constituency encompasses Bagerhat Sadar and Kachua upazilas.

History 
The constituency was created in 1984 from the Khulna-2 constituency when the former Khulna District was split into three districts: Bagerhat, Khulna, and Satkhira.

Members of Parliament

Elections

Elections in the 2010s 
Mir Showkat Ali Badsha was elected unopposed in the 2014 general election after opposition parties withdrew their candidacies in a boycott of the election.

Elections in the 2000s

Elections in the 1990s

References

External links
 

Parliamentary constituencies in Bangladesh
Bagerhat District